All Tomorrow's Parties was an organisation based in London that promoted music festivals, concerts and records throughout the world for over ten years. It was founded by Barry Hogan in 2001 in preparation for the first All Tomorrow's Parties Festival, the line-up of which was picked by Mogwai and took place at Pontins, Camber Sands, England. Named after the song "All Tomorrow's Parties" by the Velvet Underground, the festival exhibited a tendency towards post-rock, indie rock, avant-garde music, and underground hip hop, along with more traditional rock fare presented in smaller venues than typical stadium performances. It was at first a sponsorship-free festival where the organisers and artists stay in the same accommodation as the fans. It claimed to set itself apart from festivals like Reading or Glastonbury by staying intimate, non-corporate and fan-friendly. Another  difference was the line-ups  being chosen by significant bands or artists, resulting in unorthodox events which often combined acts of all sizes, eras, and genres.

Locations and artists
The festival took place in the UK, US, Japan, Iceland and Australia, and was curated by the following artists: Deerhunter, TV On The Radio, Yeah Yeah Yeahs, The National, The Drones, Greg Dulli (Afghan Whigs), Jeff Mangum (Neutral Milk Hotel), Battles, Caribou, Les Savy Fav, Amos, Animal Collective, Godspeed You! Black Emperor, Jim Jarmusch, Pavement, The Flaming Lips, The Breeders, Nick Cave & The Bad Seeds, Mike Patton & Melvins, My Bloody Valentine, Explosions In The Sky, Pitchfork Media, Portishead, Fennesz, Dirty Three, Thurston Moore, The Shins, Sleater-Kinney, Dinosaur Jr., Devendra Banhart, Mudhoney, The Mars Volta, Vincent Gallo, Slint, Jake & Dinos Chapman, Stephen Malkmus, Mogwai, Tortoise, Shellac, Stewart Lee, Sonic Youth, Boards of Canada, Autechre, Modest Mouse, Cowboy Junkies, and The Simpsons creator Matt Groening.

History
The festival had its origins in the Bowlie Weekender, curated by Belle & Sebastian at Camber Sands in April 1999. Artists, usually musicians (but sometimes visual artists like Matt Groening, whose line-up featured in the Observer's list of the ten best festivals of the year, or Jake and Dinos Chapman) were asked to curate the festival by inviting their favourite performers to play. The idea was that it was akin to dipping into the curator's record collection, or as founder Barry Hogan described it, "ATP is like an excellent mix tape".

In 2001 the organisation spawned ATP/Recordings, a record label originally created to bring out compilation albums related to its festivals. However the label eventually moved on from just doing compilations for the festival to sign and release singles and albums from artists including Threnody Ensemble, Bardo Pond, The Magic Band, Deerhoof, White Out, Death Vessel, The Drones, Fursaxa, The Scientists, Apse, Fuck Buttons, Alexander Tucker, Sleepy Sun, Spiritualized, Built To Spill, Autolux and most recently Tall Firs and Tennis. At the end of 2007 ATP/R launched series of double 7" singles called Custom Made, which would feature bands choosing four songs; one something old, one something new, one something borrowed (a cover version) and one something blue (artists were free to interpret this as they feel). Artists to release singles in this series were Australia's The Drones, Britain's Alexander Tucker and America's Deerhoof.

In 2002, the festival expanded to the US, and several events took place there in subsequent years. The organisation also became involved in booking stages at the Pitchfork Music Festival and the Primavera Sound Festival in Barcelona, Spain. In 2008, All Tomorrow's Parties ran their first East Coast USA festival, which took place at Kutsher's Hotel and Country Club, Monticello, New York. In January 2009, the festival took place for the first time in Australia, with events in Brisbane, Sydney and Mount Buller (in Victoria) all curated by Nick Cave & The Bad Seeds.

The organisation that put on these festivals also promoted concerts in London and the rest of the United Kingdom, curated the yearly Don't Look Back concert series and ran the record label ATP Recordings.

All Tomorrow's Parties, as with a number of modern festivals, embraced a variety of artistic genres. Most festival events featured art exhibitions and cinema programmes (in the US, ATP collaborated with Criterion to present cinema highlighted by appearances from Paul Schrader and Jim Jarmusch), and others featured spoken word performances, stand-up comedy, and book clubs.

In 2007 the curators allowed festival-goers to pick the line-up by organising a voting process for all ticketholders in the months running up to the event, and this was repeated in May 2009. The 2007 festival took place at Butlin's Minehead. In the years before 2013, when ATP announced they were ceasing to hold residential festivals in the UK, the festival took place up to three or four times a year in the UK (in May and then in December for the 'Nightmare Before Christmas'). UK festivals were planned to recommence in 2015, moving to Pontins Prestatyn.

In 2009, Warp Films released a feature-length documentary about the festival named All Tomorrow's Parties. It premiered at the SXSW Film Festival, and then premiered in the UK at Edinburgh in June. In October 2009 the film was screened at a number of 'one night only' UK theatrical screenings also featuring live music from Les Savy Fav, who feature in the film and have long been mainstays of All Tomorrow's Parties line-ups.

In 2010, ATP announced I'll Be Your Mirror, a series of events to take place in cities around the world named after the B-side to the original 1966 "All Tomorrow's Parties" single by the Velvet Underground. These events still involved a curator choosing all the music and films that play at the event, but without the holiday resort accommodation. The first event took place in Tokyo, Japan in February 2011.

Significant past performances at ATP festivals include the reformations of The Magic Band, Television, The Jesus Lizard, Sleep, and Slint amongst others. All Tomorrow's Parties also presented the return of My Bloody Valentine with a series of worldwide live performances throughout 2008, the London concerts of which were named Time Out London's Gig of the Year.

Financial difficulties
In 2012, the company running the events was put into liquidation, owing £2.6 million to its creditors. The company's directors set up a new firm, Wilwall, but this also experienced difficulties, filing late accounts, incurring significant debts, and was subject to court judgements related to debt. A Grizzly Bear concert at Alexandra Palace was cancelled, as was its urban festival, Jabberwocky, the latter only 3 days before the event was due to take place. A festival hosted by Drive Like Jehu was to be held in Prestatyn in Wales in 2016, but this was moved to Manchester in England, before being cancelled. A few months later the company went in administration, and its scheduled festival in Iceland was cancelled.

See also
List of electronic music festivals
 List of music festivals in the United Kingdom
 All Tomorrow's Parties, a 2009 documentary film

References

External links

 All Tomorrow's Parties Official Site
 Don't Look Back Official Site
 All Tomorrow's Parties Film Website
 Jabberwocky Festival
 ATP Iceland

Music festivals in East Sussex
Music festivals in Somerset
Rock festivals in the United Kingdom
Electronic music festivals in the United Kingdom
Music festivals established in 1999
Albums with cover art by Matt Groening